Skarsjövallen, because of sponsorship reasons formerly known as Markbygg Arena, HA Bygg Arena,  Starke Arvid and Uddevalla Arena, is a football stadium in Ljungskile, Sweden. The stadium holds 6,000 people, but the capacity can quickly be expanded to 8,000, if needed.

It is the home arena of Ljungskile SK.

Football venues in Sweden
Ljungskile SK